The following lists events that happened during 1922 in New Zealand.

Incumbents

Regal and viceregal
 Head of State  – George V
 Governor-General – John Jellicoe, Viscount Jellicoe

Government
The 20th New Zealand Parliament concludes. The general election held in December sees the Reform Party lose its majority and need to negotiate for support with Independents and two Liberal Party MPs to remain in government.

Speaker of the House – Frederick Lang
Prime Minister – William Massey
Minister of Finance – William Massey
Minister of External Affairs – Ernest Lee

Parliamentary opposition
Leader of the Opposition – Thomas Wilford (Liberal Party)

Judiciary
 Chief Justice – Sir Robert Stout

Main centre leaders
Mayor of Auckland – James Gunson
Mayor of Wellington – Robert Wright
Mayor of Christchurch – Henry Thacker
Mayor of Dunedin – James Douglas

Events 
 25 January – The Southern Maori by-election is won by Henare Uru, following the death of his brother, Hopere Uru, the sitting member, in November the previous year

Arts and literature

See 1922 in art, 1922 in literature, :Category:1922 books

Music

See: 1922 in music

Radio

See: Public broadcasting in New Zealand

Film
My Lady of the Cave
The Birth of New Zealand
Ten Thousand Miles in the Southern Cross

See: :Category:1922 film awards, 1922 in film, List of New Zealand feature films, Cinema of New Zealand, :Category:1922 films

Sport

Chess
 The 30th National Chess Championship is held in Dunedin, and is won by John Boyd Dunlop of Oamaru (his second title)

Cricket
 Plunket Shield

Football
 A tour by Australia includes three internationals, the first by a New Zealand representative team:
 17 June – Carisbrook, Dunedin: won 3–1 by New Zealand
 24 June – Athletic Park, Wellington: drawn 1–1
 8 July – Auckland Domain, Auckland: won 3–1 by New Zealand
 Provincial league champions:
 Auckland – North Shore, Philomel (shared)
 Canterbury – Rangers
 Hawke's Bay – Hastings United
 Nelson – Athletic
 Otago – Seacliff
 South Canterbury – Rangers
 Southland – Corinthians
 Taranaki – Hawera
 Wanganui – Eastown Workshops
 Wellington – Waterside

Golf
 The ninth New Zealand Open championship is won by A. Brooks.
 The 26th National Amateur Championships are held in the Manawatu:
 Men – Arthur Duncan (Wellington) (his ninth title)
 Women – G. Williams (her fifth title)

Horse racing

Harness racing
 New Zealand Trotting Cup – Agathos
 Auckland Trotting Cup – Minton Derby

Thoroughbred racing
 New Zealand Cup – Scion
 Auckland Cup – Scion
 Wellington Cup – Insurrection
 New Zealand Derby – Enthusiasm

Lawn bowls
The national outdoor lawn bowls championships are held in Dunedin.
 Men's singles champion – J.C. Rigby (North-East Valley Bowling Club)
 Men's pair champions – J. Brackenridge, J.M. Brackenridge (skip) (Newtown Bowling Club)
 Men's fours champions – J.A. McKinnon, W.B. Allan, W. Allan, W. Carswell (skip) (Taieri Bowling Club)

Rugby union
 1922 New Zealand rugby union tour of New South Wales
  loses the Ranfurly Shield on the first challenge, losing to  9–19.

Rugby league
 1922 New Zealand rugby league season

Births

January–February
 5 January – Bob Aynsley, rugby league player
 12 January – Una Wickham, cricketer
 16 January – Bert Wipiti, World War II fighter pilot
 18 January – Bill Pearson, writer
 29 January – Ronald Hugh Morrieson, writer
 4 February – Joan Wiffen, palaeontologist
 8 February – Laurie Salas, women's rights and peace activist
 13 February – Godfrey Bowen, shearer
 19 February – Marie Bell, educationalist, lecturer, teacher
 24 February – Joyce Macdonald, swimmer
 27 February – Anthony Treadwell, architect

March–April
 9 March – Ian Turbott, colonial administrator, university administrator
 13 March – Brun Smith, cricketer
 17 March – Pat Suggate, geologist
 18 March – Johnny Simpson, rugby union player
 21 March – Frank Watkins, World War II pilot
 22 March – Dick Shortt, cricket umpire
 24 March – Vincent Gray, chemist, climate-change skeptic
 25 March – Grace Hollander, community leader
 26 March – Bill Mumm, rugby union player, politician
 8 April – Arnold Christensen, World War II fighter pilot, "Great Escape" participant
 12 April – Ann Wylie, botanist
 19 April – Jack Dodd, physicist
 21 April – Zena Abbott, weaver
 22 April – Frank Houston, Pentecostal Christian pastor
 28 April – Ruth Kirk, anti-abortion campaigner, wife of Norman Kirk
 30 April – Avis M. Dry, clinical psychologist

May–June
 11 May – Marguerite Story, Cook Islands politician
 16 May – Peter Hall, World War II pilot
 18 May – Ian Botting, rugby union player
 25 May – Joyce Powell, cricketer
 8 June – Jim Weir, diplomat
 14 June – Max Carr, field athlete and coach, athletics official, air force officer
 19 June – Ray Forster, arachnologist, museum director
 24 June – Ken Avery, jazz musician, songwriter
 28 June – Pauline O'Regan, educator, community worker, writer

July–August
 4 July – Derek Wilson, architect, environmentalist
 10 July – Rowan Barbour, cricketer
 22 July – Jim Allen, visual artist
 25 July – Alan Peart, World War II fighter pilot
 31 July
 Kenneth Clark, ceramicist
 Owen Hardy, World War II fighter pilot
 9 August – Peter Johnstone, rugby union player
 1 August – Alf Budd, rugby union player
 2 August – Dell Bandeen, netball player
 10 August – John Feeney, documentary film director
 13 August – Arch Jelley, athletics coach 
 20 August – Rona McKenzie, cricketer

September–October
 1 September – Harold Logan, Standardbred racehorse
 11 September – Jack Shallcrass, author, educator, humanist
 15 September – Norman Rumsey, optical systems designer
 17 September – Ted Smith, rower
 26 September – 
 Johnny Smith, rugby union player
 Brian Waugh, airline operator and pilot
 4 October – Morrie Church, rugby league coach
 9 October – Kendrick Smithyman, poet
 10 October – 
 Harry Cave, cricketer
 Nan Clark, trade unionist
 11 October – Cole Wilson, musician, singer-songwriter
 12 October – Randal Elliott, ophthalmologist
 18 October – Laurie Haig, rugby union player
 21 October –
 Bruce Barclay, politician
 Hone Tuwhare, poet
 30 October – Bob Chapman, political scientist, historian

November–December
 3 November – Alan Blake, rugby union player (died 2010)
 7 November – Roy McKenzie, horse breeder, philanthropist (died 2007)
 13 November – Syd Jensen, motorcycle racer, motor racing driver (died 1999)
 14 November – Douglas MacDiarmid, painter (died 2020)
 16 November – J.C.P. Williams, cardiologist
 19 November – Yvonne Rust, potter (died 2002)
 22 November – Helen Brew, actor, birth campaigner, documentary filmmaker, educator and speech therapist (died 2013)
 25 November – Maurice Duggan, writer (died 1974)
 1 December – William James Lanyon Smith, naval officer (died 2018)
 5 December – Keith Sinclair, historian, poet, politician (died 1993)
 13 December – Norm Wilson, rugby union player  (died 2001)
 19 December – Christine Cole Catley, journalist, publisher, author (died 2001)
 26 December – Iain Gallaway, cricketer and broadcaster (died 2021)

Exact date unknown
 Bettina Welch, actor

Deaths

January–March
 4 January – William Wilson McCardle, nurseryman, founder of Pahiatua, politician (born 1844)
 14 January – Arthur Thomas Bate, sharebroker, public servant, rugby union and cricket administrator, philatelist (born 1855)
 16 January – Alan Scott, World War I pilot (born 1883)
 18 February – Thomas Peacock, politician (born 1837)
 20 January – Henry Harper, Anglican priest (born 1833)
 24 February – W. D. H. Baillie, politician (born 1827)
 7 March – Alexander Donald, sailmaker, merchant, ship owner (born 1842)

April–June
 1 April – George Carter, rugby union player (born 1854)
 3 April – Horace Moore-Jones, war artist (born 1868)
 14 April – Emma Ostler, businesswoman, prohibitionist (born 1848)
 19 April – Percy Smith, ethnologist, surveyor (born 1840)
 21 April – Robert Thompson, politician (born 1840)
 15 May – Edward Kellett, politician (born 1864)
 25 May – Edith Mellish, Anglican deaconess and nun (born 1861)
 28 May – John von Dadelszen, public servant, statistician (born 1845)
 15 June – Peter Dignan, politician, mayor of Auckland (1897–98) (born 1847)
 16 June – Henry Wise, stationer, printer, publisher (born 1835)
 18 June – Robert Lee, teacher, school inspector, educationalist (born 1837)
 23 June – Myer Caselberg, businessman, politician, mayor of Masterton (1886–88) (born 1841)
 27 June – Frederick George Ewington, estate agent, philanthropist, pamphleteer (born 1844)
 28 June – George Helmore, rugby union player (born 1862)

July–September
 2 July – Seymour Thorne George, politician (born 1851)
 14 July – Edward Seager, policeman, gaoler, asylum superintendent (born 1828)
 29 July – Charles John Ayton, diarist (born 1846)
 29 August – Charles Albert Creery Hardy, politician (born 1865)
 30 August – 
 John Ewing, goldminer (born 1844)
 Tom Pollard, comic opera producer and manager (born 1857)
 31 August – James Job Holland, politician, mayor of Auckland (1893–96) (born 1841)
 3 September – Donald Reid, politician (born 1850)
 16 September – Constance Barnicoat, stenographer, interpreter, mountaineer, journalist (born 1872)
 22 September – Elizabeth Torlesse, community leader (born  1835)
 29 September – Lewis Hotop, pharmacist, Arbor Day advocate, politician, mayor of Queenstown (1880–81, 1891–94, 1903–06) (born 1844)

October–December
 12 October – William Whitby, master mariner, ship owner (born 1838)
 13 October – Edward Pearce, politician (born 1832)
 22 November – Moore Neligan, Anglican bishop (born 1863)
 14 December – Ann Robertson, businesswoman, litigant (born 1825)
 15 December – Richard Tucker, wool scourer (born 1856)
 16 December – Charles Harley. politician, mayor of Nelson (1915–17) (born 1861)
 18 December – John James Pringle, dermatologist (born 1855)
 25 December – George Sale, politician, newspaper editor, university professor (born 1831)
 26 December – Arthur Rhodes, politician, mayor of Christchurch (1901–02) (born 1859)

See also
History of New Zealand
List of years in New Zealand
Military history of New Zealand
Timeline of New Zealand history
Timeline of New Zealand's links with Antarctica
Timeline of the New Zealand environment

References

External links

 
Years of the 20th century in New Zealand